Micatone is a German nu jazz band, consisting of the members Boris Meinhold on the guitar and synth, Tim Kroker on the drums, Sebastian "Hagen" Demmin on the keyboards (who previously worked as a live keyboard player with the electronic music band Daft Punk), Lisa Bassenge on the vocals, Rogall on the sequence programming, and Paul Kleber on the double bass.

Discography

Studio albums
 Nine Songs (2001, Sonar Kollektiv)
 Is You Is (2003, Sonar Kollektiv)
 Nomad Songs (2005, Sonar Kollektiv)
 Wish I Was Here (2012, Sonar Kollektiv)
 The Crack (2017, Sonar Kollektiv)

EPs/Singles 
 Micatone EP, 12" EP (2000)
 Remixes, 12" EP (2001)
 Step into the Gallery, 12" (2001)
 Plastic Bags & Magazines, 12" EP (2003)
 Yeah Yeah Yeah (That's the Way It Goes), Single (2005)
 Nomad Remixes, 12" (2005)
 Gun Dog, 12" (2012)

References

External links
Official website
Official Myspace
TunesBag page

German electronic music groups
Sonar Kollektiv artists
Nu jazz musicians
Musical groups from Berlin